In enzymology, a phosphoacetylglucosamine mutase is an enzyme that catalyzes the chemical reaction

N-acetyl-alpha-D-glucosamine 1-phosphate  N-acetyl-D-glucosamine 6-phosphate

Hence, this enzyme has one substrate, N-acetyl-alpha-D-glucosamine 1-phosphate, and one product, N-acetyl-D-glucosamine 6-phosphate.

This enzyme belongs to the family of isomerases, specifically the phosphotransferases (phosphomutases), which transfer phosphate groups within a molecule.  The systematic name of this enzyme class is N-acetyl-alpha-D-glucosamine 1,6-phosphomutase. Other names in common use include acetylglucosamine phosphomutase, acetylglucosamine phosphomutase, acetylaminodeoxyglucose phosphomutase, phospho-N-acetylglucosamine mutase, and N-acetyl-D-glucosamine 1,6-phosphomutase.  This enzyme participates in aminosugars metabolism.  This enzyme has at least one effector, N-Acetyl-D-glucosamine 1,6-bisphosphate.

Structural studies

References

 
 
 Boyer, P.D. (Ed.), The Enzymes, 3rd ed., vol. 6, 1972, p. 407-477.
 

EC 5.4.2
Enzymes of known structure